Snøhetta is a Norwegian architectural firm headquartered in Oslo, Norway.

Background
The company was formed in 1987 by Norwegian, Kjetil Thorsen, and a group of young architects. They named it Snøhetta after the tallest mountain in the Dovrefjell National Park. In 1989 they joined forces with New York architect, Craig Dykers, to enter the competition to design a replacement for the Library of Alexandria (the winning design for Bibliotheca Alexandrina wasn't completed until 2001).

Awards
Snøhetta has received the World Architecture Award for the Bibliotheca Alexandrina and the Oslo Opera House, and the Aga Khan Award for Architecture for the Bibliotheca Alexandrina. Since its completion in 2008, the Oslo Opera House has also been awarded the Mies van der Rohe Award, the EDRA (Environmental Design Research Association) Great Places Award, the European Prize for Urban Public Space, In 2010, through Kjetil Trædal Thorsen’s lead, Snøhetta’s works’ coherence with their environment was awarded the Global Award for Sustainable Architecture, both from an international point of view, for their large scale projects, and at a local, small projects scale.

Notable works

 Toronto Metropolitan University Student Learning Centre in Toronto (2015)
 Expansion of the San Francisco Museum of Modern Art (2016)
 Lascaux IV International Centre for Cave Art in Montignac, France (2016)
 Redesign and renovation of Times Square, New York (2017)
 Calgary Central Library, Alberta, Canada (2018)
 Under, underwater restaurant in Lindesnes, Norway
Wolfe Center for the Arts at Bowling Green State University in Ohio
Westchester Square Library in The Bronx, New York City (due to open 2025)

Further reading
 
 
 Snøhetta: Hus som vil meg hysa, Kjartan Fløgstad, 2004. .

References

External links

Snøhetta Official website

Companies based in Oslo
Design companies established in 1989
Architecture firms of Norway
Industrial design firms
Norwegian companies established in 1989